Songsak Hemkeaw ( born April 8, 1980), simply known as Sak. He is a professional footballer from Chaiyaphum, Thailand. He currently plays for Loei City.

Honor

Regional League Division 2:
Winners : 2015
Regional League North-East Division
 Runner-up : 2015
Regional League Division 2
 Winners  :2013
Regional League North-East Division
 Winners  :2013
Regional League North-East Division
 Winners  :2012
Regional League North-East Division
 Winners  :2011

External links
Profile at Thaipremierleague.co.th

Living people
Songsak Hemkeaw
1980 births
Songsak Hemkeaw
Association football defenders
Songsak Hemkeaw